Nettrice R. Gaskins (born September 25, 1970) is an African-American digital artist, academic, cultural critic and advocate of STEAM fields. In her work, she explores "techno-vernacular creativity" and Afrofuturism.

Education 
Gaskins was born in Baltimore MD. At DuPont Manual High School Gaskins once painted a mural of parabolic functions in her math class and created computer art illustrating the connection of contemporary door-knocker earrings to traditional Ghanaian accessories. She was engaged, at even that early an age, with the intersection of art and science. That work led the way to her acceptance to Pratt Institute in Brooklyn where she earned her BFA in 1992.

In 1994 she received her MFA in Art and Technology from School of the Art Institute of Chicago. After working for some years in K–12 and post-secondary education, community media and technology, Gaskins received a doctorate in Digital Media from Georgia Tech in 2014. Her thesis started with making the connections of graffiti and math.

In 2014 she became director of the STEAM Lab at Boston Art Academy which serves forty percent Black and forty percent Latino high-school students. As of 2018, Gaskins was a program manager at the Fab Foundation, a Boston-based nonprofit. In 2019, she had an artist-in-residence at MathTalk PBC and part of the Autodesk Technology Center Residency program on behalf of MathTalk. Gaskins is currently the assistant director of the Lesley STEAM Learning Lab at Lesley University.

Career 
Gaskins investigates humans versus nature, sound versus imagery. She wants people of color to be able to see themselves in computing and digital technology fields. She is known for her STEAM work, arguing that adding Art to the traditional Science, Technology, Engineering and Math education will open more opportunities for students of color.  She believes that STEM has always existed within groups that are not traditionally part of the mainstream discourse, and through the arts (like hip-hop, film, dance, theater, video games, and visual art) people may realize that these groups were always part of the conversation. She is inspired by the “entrepreneurial spirit," as she calls it, as a way to progress, visible in such ingenious pioneers as Fred Eversley, John Coltrane, Sun Ra, George Clinton and Grandmaster Flash who adapted the currently used cross-fader from reclaimed electronics.

Her work creates spaces that respond to culture, within a culture, thus become a catalyst for change inside communities, instead of being in the control of others. She is also known for her cultural criticism, including the unpacking of Beyoncé's Formation video at the intersection of contemporary police killings of black boys and the story of traditional voodoo spirit, Ghede Nibo.

In 2014, Gaskins spoke at a symposium called "Afrofuturism in Black Theology: Race, Gender, Sexuality and the State of Black Religion in the Black Metropolis" featuring George Clinton at Vanderbilt University. She spoke at a symposium called "Why Comix? Drawing the World You Want to See" about representation in comics at Northwestern University and on a panel called the Aesthetic Architecture Symposium titled "The Aesthetics of Activism: Afro-Futurism, Xenofeminism, and Disobedient Objects" at Yale University in 2016.

Dr. Gaskins' artistic collaboration with artificial intelligence began when teaching high school computer science students about DeepDream.

Gaskins' digital installation, AR Virtual Sounding Space, using both physical computing and projection mapping, was the 2015 feature of Paseo Pop Up, a festival produced by Paseo Projects in Taos, New Mexico. It was a digital projection on the Luna Chapel at the Couse-Sharp Historic Site. The immersive projected piece was inspired by cosmograms, culturally-based maps of space and time like the medicine wheel. The public then could affect the piece through gloves that control the sound and color of the projection. As part of this engagement, she was one of a few artists with engagements in Electrofunk Mixtape: A Virtual Sounding Space, a workshop with local students. She performed Electrofunk Mixtape: Illuminus Edition with Hank Shocklee in Boston, MA as part of the Illuminus outdoor festival.

In 2017, Gaskins was in the group exhibition, We Have Always Lived in the Future at Flux Factory in Long Island City, NY. This show was mentioned in Art in America, specifically how her work "presents opportunities for rousing transcendence."

In 2018, Gaskins was in the group exhibition, Probability & Uncertainty at Union College's Mandeville Gallery in Schenectady, NY. "Afrofuturism Amplified in Three Dimensions" included a lecture and maker workshop. In the show, Gaskins was one of six women artists working with scientific themes. She also presented at the National Art Education Association in Seattle, WA, in Barcelona as part of STEAMConf 2018 and in Madrid as part of International Girls in ICT Day.

In 2019, Gaskins was part of a Leoni Art Project group show in Genoa, Italy. Her algorithmic, "neural network" generated portrait of Wangari Muta Maathai was featured in Horticultural Heroes, an exhibit at Tower Hill Botanic Garden in Boylston, MA.

Gaskins' work was one five commissions slated to appear at the Smithsonian's FUTURES exhibition, which is scheduled to open in November 2021 in the Arts and Industries Building. Her "Featured Futurists" portraits that include such figures as Octavia Butler were made using a A.I. neutral network application called DeepDream.

In 2021, Gaskins was part of the Transfiguration group exhibition at the Frost Art Museum in Miami, Florida. The show was part of the Martin Luther King, Jr. Exhibition Series, which addresses issues of race, diversity, social justice, civil rights, and humanity. Gaskins also gave an artist talk in conjunction with the exhibition.

In 2022, Gaskins' AI-generated portrait of Greg Tate was installed as an outdoor mural by the Museum of Contemporary African Diasporan Art (MoCADA) in Brooklyn, NY. The same image was on view at Lincoln Center in NYC as part of In Praise of Shadow Boxers, Dissonance & Dissidents: A Pop-Up Tribute Exhibition to Greg Tate.

Gaskins' AI-generated artwork was on display as part of The Black Angel of History: Myth-Science, Metamodernism, and the Metaverse in Carnegie Hall’s Zankel Hall Gallery. In addition, she was commissioned to create five AI-generated portraits for the Boston Modern Opera Project's As Told By: History, Race, and Justice on the Opera Stage series.

Publications 
 Gaskins, Nettrice. “Interrogating Algorithmic Bias: From Speculative Fiction to Liberatory Design.” TechTrends. (Sept. 11, 2022).
 Gaskins, Nettrice. “Interrogating AI Bias through Digital Art.” Just Tech. (Sept. 2022).
 Gaskins, Nettrice. Techno-Vernacular Creativity and Innovation. Cambridge, MA: The MIT Press (August 2021).
Gaskins, Nettrice. "Cosmogramic Design: A Cultural Model of the Aesthetic Response." In Aesthetics Equals Politics: New Discourses across Art, Architecture, and Philosophy. Cambridge, MA: The MIT Press, 2019.
Gaskins, Nettrice. "Techno-Vernacular Creativity and Innovation across the African Diaspora and Global South." In Captivating Technology: Race, Carceral Technoscience, and Liberatory Imagination in Everyday Life. Durham, NC: Duke University Press, 2019.
Gaskins, Nettrice. "Mama Wata Remixed: The Mermaid in Contemporary African-American Culture." In Scaled for Success: The Internationalisation of the Mermaid. East Barnet, UK: John Libbey Publishing, 2018.
Gaskins, Nettrice. "Why Black Panther's Shuri Is So Important To Young Black Girls and Maker Culture" SyFy Wired (February 27, 2018).
Gaskins, Nettrice. "Deep Sea Dwellers: Drexciya and the Sonic Third Space." Shima: The International Journal of Research into Island Cultures 10, no. 2 (2016). doi:10.21463/shima.10.2.08.
 Gaskins, Nettrice. "How Art and Dance Are Making Computer Science Culturally Relevant" EdSurge. (July 26, 2016).
 Gaskins, Nettrice. "Marvel's Black Panther Makes STEAM Relevant to Under Represented Youth; Plus, VR's Century-Old Roots"  EdSurge. (July 5, 2016).
 Gaskins, Nettrice. "Afrofuturism on Web 3.0: Vernacular Cartography and Augmented Space." In Afrofuturism 2.0: The Rise of Astroblackness. Lanham, MA: Lexington Books, 2016.
 Gaskins, Nettrice. "The African Cosmogram Matrix in Contemporary Art and Culture." Black Theology 14, no. 1 (2016): 28–42. doi:10.1080/14769948.2015.1131502.
 Gaskins, Nettrice. "Re-Creating Niobe: The Construction and Re-Construction of Black Femininity through Games and the Social Psychology of the Avatar." In Future Texts: Subversive Performance and Feminist Bodies. Anderson, SC: Parlor Press, 2016.
 Gaskins, Nettrice. "Welcome to Afrofuturism 3.0" Slate. (December 2, 2015).
 Gaskins, Nettrice. "Deconstructing the unisphere: hip-hop on a shrinking globe in an expanding universe." In Meet Me At the Fair, 155–64. Pittsburgh, PA: ETC Press, 2014.
 Gaskins, Nettrice. "Advancing STEM Through Culturally Situated Arts-Based Learning." Journal of the New Media Caucus 9, no. 1 (Spring 2013).
 Gaskins, Nettrice. "Urban Metaphysics: Creating Game Layers on Top of the World." UCLA's Journal of Cinema and Media Studies (Winter 2012).

References

External links 
 
 
 Techno-Vernacular Creativity, Innovation and Learning in Underrepresented Ethnic Communities of Practice.

1970 births
21st-century American women artists
Living people
African-American women artists
21st-century American artists
Artists from Baltimore
Pratt Institute alumni
DuPont Manual High School alumni
School of the Art Institute of Chicago alumni
Georgia Tech alumni
21st-century African-American women
21st-century African-American artists
20th-century African-American people
20th-century African-American women